Ferrexpo plc is a Swiss-based commodity trading and mining company which is the third largest exporter of iron ore pellets in the world. Ferrexpo's operating base is in central Ukraine, where it operates three iron-ore mines and an iron ore pellet production facility. The company's trading office is located in London where it is listed on the London Stock Exchange and it is a constituent of the FTSE 250 Index and FTSE4Good Index.

History
The business was founded by the Soviet government in 1960 as the "Poltava Mining and Extraction Combinat" to exploit iron ore reserves in Horishni Plavni (formerly Komsomolsk), Ukraine. In 1977 it started selling its product in the form of iron ore pellets.

In June 2007, Ferrexpo plc was listed on the London Stock Exchange, producing 8.6 million tonnes of iron ore pellets in the year prior to listing.

In 2008 and 2009 the company established additional new complexes around Horishni Plavni and Kremenchuk. In 2011, the Company opened its second iron ore mine, the Yeristovo mine, which is located immediately north of the Company's main iron ore mine - the Poltava iron ore mine. Upon opening Yeristovo, Ferrexpo became the first company to open a new mine in Ukraine since the country's independence.

In March 2019 the company delayed publication of its results pending an investigation into charitable donations in Ukraine. In April 2019 its auditors Deloitte resigned, with Ferrexpo's former chief financial officer selling £400,000 of shares the day before the announcement. In August 2019 Ferrexpo announced that the charitable donations may have been misappropriated; it had donated $24 million to the charity in 2017 and $9.5 million in 2018. In October 2019, the CEO, Kostyantyn Zhevago, stood down from his post, following allegations of the embezzlement of $113 million from the Finance & Credit Bank.

Following Zhevago's departure, Jim North became acting CEO; the company announced his appointment as permanent CEO in February 2022.

Operations
Ferrexpo produces iron ore pellets, which are used in the global steel industry to produce high quality types of steel. Iron ore pellets are the highest quality form of iron ore that steel producers can utilise, offering steel producers the opportunity to improve blast furnace productivity, whilst simultaneously reducing carbon emissions by at least 30% for every tonne of pellets used instead of the more commonly used sinter fines, which are typically lower grade and require sintering prior to charging into the blast furnace.

The Company, which sells most of its product to steel mills of Central Europe and Asia, is organised into the following units:
 Ukraine - mining
 Switzerland - home base
 London - registered office, trading
 Dubai - distribution and sale
 Singapore - distribution and sale
 Shanghai - distribution and sale
 Tokyo - distribution and sale

The company's mining components are all based in central Ukraine and consist of:

 Poltava Mining and Enrichment Complex (1970s), Horishni Plavni
 Yeristovo Mining and Enrichment Complex (2008), Yerystivka village, Kremenchuk Raion (see: Yeristovskoye mine)
 Belanovo Mining and Enrichment Complex (est. 2009, under construction), Bazaluky village, Horishni Plavni municipality and Nova Haleshchyna, Kozelshchyna Raion (see: Belanovskoye mine)

Additionally, the company owns several nearby iron deposits which are not yet being actively exploited. From north to south, these are:
 Brovarkovskoye mine
 Manuilovskoye mine
 Kharchenkovskoye mine
 Vasilievskoye mine
 Zarudenskoye mine

Ownership
The founder, Kostyantyn Zhevago, owns 50.3% of the company. Kostyantyn Zhevago was arrested in December 2022 under an international arrest warrant, he is wanted in Ukraine in a major embezzlement case.

References

External links
 Official site

Non-renewable resource companies established in 1960
Iron ore mining companies
Companies listed on the London Stock Exchange
Economy of Poltava Oblast
Metal companies of Switzerland
Mining in Ukraine
1960 establishments in Ukraine